Prasiolales is an order of green algae in the class Trebouxiophyceae.

Genera of uncertain placement to family:
Elliptochloris
Prasionella
Prasionema
Rosenvingiellopsis

References

External links
 

 
Chlorophyta orders